The SIAM Journal on Numerical Analysis (SINUM; until 1965: Journal of the Society for Industrial & Applied Mathematics, Series B: Numerical Analysis) is a peer-reviewed mathematical journal published by the Society for Industrial and Applied Mathematics that covers research on the analysis of numerical methods. The journal was established in 1964 and appears bimonthly. The editor-in-chief is Angela Kunoth.

References

External links
 

Numerical Analysis
Mathematics journals
Bimonthly journals
Publications established in 1964
English-language journals